Kirill Yermakovich (born 11 January 1999) is a Belarusian footballer who plays for Gomel.

He's a son of Belarusian footballer and coach Alyaksandr Yermakovich.

Honours
Gomel
Belarusian Cup winner: 2021–22

References

External links

1999 births
Living people
Belarusian footballers
Association football midfielders
FC BATE Borisov players
FC Belshina Bobruisk players
FC Gomel players
FC Krumkachy Minsk players
FC Vitebsk players